The track and field competition at the 1993 Central American and Caribbean Games was held in November at the Estadio Francisco Montaner in Ponce, Puerto Rico.

Medal summary

Men's events

Women's events

Medal table

See also
1993 in athletics (track and field)

References

 
 
 

Athletics at the Central American and Caribbean Games
C
A
1993 CAC Games